Protein phosphatase 1 regulatory subunit 3G is a protein that is encoded by the PPP1R3G gene in humans.

References

Further reading